This list of ports in Denmark lists major ports in Denmark by cargo volume in 2014 as defined by Statistics Denmark.

Cargo refers to all transferred units including freight cargo, bulk cargo, containers, vehicles and passengers. Freight cargo includes bulk cargo and containers.

References 

Ports
Denmark